There are 54 ethnic groups in Vietnam recognized by the Vietnamese government. Each ethnicity has their own language, traditions, and subculture. The largest ethnic groups are: Kinh 85.32%, Tay 1.92%, Thái 1.89%, Mường 1.51%, Hmong 1.45%, Khmer 1.37%, Nùng 1.13%, Dao 0.93%, Hoa 0.78%, with all others accounting for the remaining 3.7% (2019 census). The Vietnamese term for minority ethnic groups are người thiểu số and dân tộc ít người (minority people).

List of ethnic groups
The total population of Vietnam was 96,208,984 according to the 2019 census.

Other
 Nguồn - possibly Mường group, officially classified as a Việt (Kinh) group by the government, Nguồn themselves identify with Việt ethnicity; their language is a member of the Viet–Muong branch of the Vietic sub-family
 Sui people (Người Thủy) - officially classified as Pa Then people.
 According to news from Dantri, an online newspaper in Vietnam, the Thừa Thiên-Huế People's Committee in September 2008 announced a plan to do more research in a new ethnic group in Vietnam. It is Pa Kô, also called Pa Cô, Pa Kô, Pa-Kô or Pa Kôh. This ethnic group settles mainly in A Lưới suburban district (Thừa Thiên-Huế) and mountainous area of Hướng Hóa (Quảng Trị). At the present, however, they have been classified in Tà Ôi ethnic group.

Many of the local ethnic groups residing in mountain areas are known collectively in the West as Montagnard or Degar. One distinctive feature of highland ethnic minority groups in Vietnam is that they are colorfully attired whether at home, in the farm, traveling or in their home town.

Foreign expatriate workers are a small portion of the population, some settling permanently or through marriage. Many are migrants from neighboring Asian countries like China, though some are from the west. Today, 2,700 Americans live in Vietnam. Moreover, some descend from the French and other Europeans from the colonial period. However, most European descendants left after Vietnam gained independence.

See also
 Demographics of Vietnam
 Vietnam#Demographics

References
 1999 Census results
 Socioeconomic Atlas of Vietnam, 1999

Citations

Further reading
 Nguyễn Trọng Tấn; Viện khoa học xã hội Việt Nam - Viện dân tộc học - Tạp chí dân tộc học. 2005. Tổng mục lục 30 năm tạp chí dân tộc học (1974 - 2004). Hà Nội: Nhà xuất bản khoa học xã hội.

External links
 Modern photographs of all Ethnic groups in Vietnam
 socio-economic parameters of ethnic and non-ethnic people {http://www.communityresearch.org.nz/research/comparison-of-ethnic-mimnority-socio-economics-with-main-stream-in-vietnam/}
 Ethnic groups of Vietnam (State Committee for Ethnic Minority Affairs)
 Vietnamese Ethnic Groups
 Ethnic - Linguistic Map of Vietnam
 Vietnamese ethnic groups by population
 Ethnologue report for Vietnam
 Story and Images of Missionaries interacting with Mountain Tribe groups in Vietnam from 1929-1975
 Authentic Old photographs of all Ethnic groups in Vietnam

 
Ethnic groups
Vietnam